Frederick Louis may refer to:
 Frederick Louis, Count of Nassau-Ottweiler
 Frederick Louis, Count Palatine of Zweibrücken
 Frederick Louis, Hereditary Grand Duke of Mecklenburg-Schwerin
 Frederick Louis, Prince of Hohenlohe-Ingelfingen
 Frederick Charles Louis, Duke of Schleswig-Holstein-Sonderburg-Beck
 Frederick Louis, Duke of Schleswig-Holstein-Sonderburg-Beck
 Frederick Louis of Württemberg (heir apparent)
 Frederick Louis of Württemberg-Winnental

See also
 Frederick Lewis (disambiguation)